Joel Holst was an American baseball coach, and was the former head baseball coach of the Wartburg Knights. Holst played college baseball and college football at Coe College from 1981 to 1985. He then served as the head coach at West Delaware high school in Manchester, Iowa before making a stop at Northwest Missouri State as an assistant.  He got his first head coaching job at Loras College before arriving at Wartburg College in 1996.

Playing career
Holst played both baseball and football for Coe College in Cedar Rapids, Iowa.  He was a three starter on both teams.  He remains the career record holder for highest batting average at .403. In 2011, Holst was inducted to the Coe College athletic hall of fame.

Coaching career

Loras College
Holst began his first collegiate head coaching job at Loras College in Dubuque, Iowa in 1991.  He inherited a team with a losing record and finished the 1991 season 5-20.  In just 3 years at the helm he would lead them to their first winning record in 12 years following the 1993 season. His best season would come the following year  when they would go on to have their first 30 win season in program history.  He would leave the Loras Duhawks after 5 seasons with a 100-80 overall record.

Wartburg College
Joel Holst made the move to Wartburg in the fall of 1995.  It took him just two years to reach the top of the conference.  In just his second season, his 1997 Knights baseball team won 30 games and the conference regular season championship and a birth to the 1997 NCAA Regional.  From there they would go on an unprecedented run winning 12 straight championships from 1997 to 2008. In his time at wartburg he has won over 700 games and 16 championships, his most recent coming in 2017.  On May 12, 2018, Holst joined the 800 win club following an 8–4 win over his alma mater, Coe College in the IIAC tournament. In 2019, he was inducted into the Iowa baseball coaches hall of fame. Holst resigned from his position at Wartburg prior to the 2023 season.

Head coaching record

References

External links 
Joel Holst Coaching profile

Living people
Year of birth missing (living people)
High school baseball coaches in the United States
Baseball coaches from Iowa